WIMN-CD (channel 20) is a Class A JLTV-affiliated television station licensed to Arecibo, Puerto Rico. The station is owned by Carmen Cabrera, and its studios are located next to Arecibo Mall.

History
At the beginning in 1987, WIMN used to broadcast music videos, music specials and local news about Arecibo and the Northern Region, but then became part of Channel America. In 2001, WIMN-CA started broadcasting religious programming, now under the management of Carmen Cabrera, and was branded as Mega TV. In 2013, months after switching its digital signal, WIMN-CA joined JLTV. As of September 28, 2014, WIMN-CA changed its branding to JLTV Puerto Rico. On June 6, 2015, the station was licensed for digital operation and changed its call sign to WIMN-CD. On September 20, 2017, WIMN-CD was forced to go off the air due to the passage of Hurricane Maria. Since October 1, 2018, WIMN-CD returned to the air from its new transmitter and reverts its branding to Israel TV.

Digital channel

Logos

External links 

IMN-CD
Arecibo, Puerto Rico
Low-power television stations in the United States
Television channels and stations established in 1987
1987 establishments in Puerto Rico
Jews and Judaism in Puerto Rico
Jewish television
Religious television stations